Rony Alexander Argueta (born January 4, 1991) is an American soccer player who plays as a midfielder for PEPO.

Early life and education 
Argueta was born in Fountain Valley, California, but was raised in Costa Mesa, California.  He attended Estancia High School where he played for the varsity soccer team for three years.  While there, he also competed in football and tennis.

Argueta later enrolled at the University of California, Santa Barbara.  He joined the UC Santa Barbara Gauchos men's soccer team to play college soccer, but made no appearances for the team.  He later joined UCSB's club soccer team.

Playing career 
Argueta joined USL PDL club Ventura County Fusion just prior to their play-off run in 2014.  He appeared twice in the 2014 PDL season playoffs, scoring once.

Argueta turned professional with USL franchise Colorado Springs Switchbacks FC, signing a contract in January 2015.  In his first year with the club, he made 24 appearances and scored twice.  He was re-signed for the following season. Argueta won the Back Chat Supporters 2016 Young Player of the Season award.

On December 17, 2016 it was announced via Twitter he had joined Celaya F.C.

On February 9, 2017, it was announced that Switchbacks FC had brought back Argueta for the 2017 season.

On December 15, 2017, it was announced that Argueta had signed with USL side Fresno FC for the 2018 season.

References

External links 
 Colorado Springs Switchbacks FC player profile
 UC Santa Barbara Gauchos player profile

1991 births
Living people
American soccer players
Association football midfielders
Colorado Springs Switchbacks FC players
Fresno FC players
People from Costa Mesa, California
Soccer players from California
Sportspeople from Orange County, California
USL Championship players
Ventura County Fusion players